Lake Kari (Lake Qari) is a lake in Armenia located on the slopes of Mount Aragats. Most of its water comes from ice and snow. It is located 3,185 m above the sea level and has a perimeter of 1,150 m. From Byurakan village an asphalt automobile road stretches towards the source of Arkashen River, the lake Kari, located on a plateau below the peaks. On the eastern side of the lake there is a meteorological station.

See also
 Mount Aragats
 Rivers and lakes of Armenia

References

Kari
Kari
Geography of Aragatsotn Province